Sundasciurus is a genus of rodent in the family Sciuridae. It contains 20 species:
Genus Sundasciurus
 Sumatran mountain squirrel (Sundasciurus altitudinis)
 Brooke's squirrel (Sundasciurus brookei)
 Davao squirrel (Sundasciurus davensis)
 Bornean mountain ground squirrel (Sundasciurus everetti)
 Fraternal squirrel (Sundasciurus fraterculus)
 Horse-tailed squirrel (Sundasciurus hippurus)
 Busuanga squirrel (Sundasciurus hoogstraali)
 Jentink's squirrel (Sundasciurus jentinki)
 Northern Palawan tree squirrel (Sundasciurus juvencus)
 Low's squirrel (Sundasciurus lowii)
 Mindanao squirrel (Sundasciurus mindanensis)
 Culion tree squirrel (Sundasciurus moellendorffi)
 Natuna squirrel (Sundasciurus natunensis)
 Philippine tree squirrel (Sundasciurus philippinensis)
 Palawan montane squirrel (Sundasciurus rabori)
 Robinson's squirrel (Sundasciurus robinsoni)
 Samar squirrel (Sundasciurus samarensis)
 Southern Palawan tree squirrel (Sundasciurus steerii)
 Upland squirrel (Sundasciurus tahan)
 Slender squirrel (Sundasciurus tenuis)

References

 den Tex, R.-J., Thorington, R., Maldonado, J.E., Leondard, J.A. 2010. Speciation dynamics in the SE Asian tropics: Putting a time perspective on the phylogeny and biogeography of Sundaland tree squirrels, Sundasciurus. Molecular Phylogenetics and Evolution 55: 711–720.
Hawkins, M.T.R., Helgen, K.M., Maldonado, J.E., Rockwood, L.L., Tsuchiya, M.T.N., Leonard, J.A. 2016. Phylogeny, biogeography and systematic revision of plain long-nosed squirrels (genus Dremomys, Nannosciurinae). Molecular Phylogenetics and Evolution 94: 752–764.
Hinckley, A., Hawkins, M. T., Achmadi, A. S., Maldonado, J. E., & Leonard, J. A. (2020). Ancient Divergence Driven by Geographic Isolation and Ecological Adaptation in Forest Dependent Sundaland Tree Squirrels. Frontiers in Ecology and Evolution, 8, 208.https://www.frontiersin.org/articles/10.3389/fevo.2020.00208/full

 
Rodent genera
Taxonomy articles created by Polbot